Numa Smith "Pee Wee" Moore (March 5, 1928  – April 13, 2009) was an American jazz saxophonist.

Early life and education
Moore was born in Raleigh, North Carolina and attended Washington High School in Raleigh and the Hampton Institute in Virginia, where he switched his major from pre-med to music after one semester. He joined the Royal Hamptonians and toured on a USO circuit. While traveling back to Hampton from New York, Pee Wee, while asleep in the backseat of his friend’s car, lost his left eye in an accident.

Musical career
Moore played with Lucky Millinder and Louis Jordan in 1951, and played with R&B musicians such as Wynonie Harris early in the decade. He worked with Illinois Jacquet in 1952 and James Moody in 1954-56, then played with Dizzy Gillespie in 1957, recording with him on several albums for Verve Records. He also worked with Mary Lou Williams in 1957 and Bill Doggett in 1965.

Moore moved from New York back to Raleigh in the 1970s to care for his mother and recover from alcohol addiction. There, he earned a living as a handyman while playing regularly at a variety of venues in the Raleigh-Durham area.

Discography
With Dizzy Gillespie
Dizzy Gillespie at Newport (Verve, 1957)
The Greatest Trumpet of Them All (Verve, 1957)
With James Moody
Moodsville (EmArcy, 1952)
Moody (Prestige, 1954) also released as Moody's Workshop
James Moody's Moods (Prestige, 1954–55)
Hi Fi Party (Prestige, 1955)
Wail, Moody, Wail (Prestige, 1955)
Flute 'n the Blues (Argo, 1956)
Moody's Mood for Love (Argo, 1956)

References

External links
 Images from the Pee Wee Moore Memorial Concert (June 2009) in Flickr
 Jazz Archive at Duke University
 Pee Wee Moore Papers, Rubenstein Rare Book and Manuscript Library, Duke University

American jazz saxophonists
American male saxophonists
2009 deaths
1928 births
20th-century American saxophonists
Jazz musicians from North Carolina
20th-century American male musicians
American male jazz musicians